J. lutea may refer to:

 Japonica lutea, a gossamer-winged butterfly
 Josa lutea, an anyphaenid sac spider
 Judalana lutea, a jumping spider